Hairband may refer to:

 Hair tie, an item used to fasten hair
 Headband, a clothing accessory worn in the hair or around the forehead, usually to hold hair away from the face or eyes
 Hair band, a band that plays hair metal or glam metal, a subgenre of heavy metal music